David Henry Schreiber (May 8, 1882 – October 6, 1964) was a  Major League Baseball pitcher. In 3 career games, he had a 0–0 record, with a 5.40 ERA. He batted and threw left-handed.

Schreiber was born in Waverly, Ohio and died in Chillicothe, Ohio.

External links

1882 births
1964 deaths
Cincinnati Reds players
Major League Baseball pitchers
Baseball players from Ohio
Decatur Commodores players
Terre Haute Hottentots players
Denver Grizzlies (baseball) players
Denver Bears players
Lincoln Tigers players
People from Waverly, Ohio